The Gumbo Pot is a compilation album presented by rapper, Celly Cel.  The album was released in 2006 for the Independent Music Network and was the fourth album released by Celly Cel in 2006.  This compilation album features guest like Lil' Jon, Devin the Dude, Tech N9ne, Twista, Juvenile, Fat Pat, Crooked I, Al Kapone, Fiend and C-Note.

Track listing
"Back Up" feat. Lil' Jon & Nitro – 4:31  
"On tha Block" – 3:46  
"Straight Boss" feat. Crooked I – 4:34  
"Luv It Man" feat. Fat Pat, Mr. 3-2 & Billy Cook – 4:09  
"Toast" feat. Devin the Dude, Twista & Fel 4:04  
"I Do" feat. Tech N9ne, Popper & Boy Big – 3:46  
"From the Back" feat. Al Kapone 3:38  
"Brooklyn Nights" feat. Webbafied 3:00  
"Hoe's & Tramps" feat. Fiend & H-Hustla – 3:35  
"Gimme My C" feat. Clover King Badge Busta – 4:29  
"Frontline" feat. Cool Nutz – 3:54  
"Boppers on Da Floor" feat. S.B. & Lady Ace – 4:16  
"Lets Get Thizzed" feat. Funk Daddy & Santo Valentino – 4:07  
"Ak Ripper" feat. Juvenile & C-Note – 3:02  
"Shakedown" feat. C-Note, Trae & Anka Man – 4:11  
"State 2 State" feat. Hobo Tone & Hustlamade Bugz – 3:07  
"I Got a Dolla" feat. Goodfella – 3:43  
"Southside Reppin" feat. Young Meez & Dirty – 4:05

Celly Cel albums
2006 compilation albums
Gangsta rap compilation albums